Maimetshidae is an extinct family of wasps, known from the Cretaceous period. While originally considered relatives of Megalyridae, they are now considered to probably be close relatives of Trigonalidae.

Subdivisions 

 Subfamily †Maimetshinae Rasnitsyn 1975
 Tribe †Ahiromaimetshini Engel 2016
Ahiromaimetsha Perrichot et al. 2011 Lebanese amber, Early Cretaceous (Barremian)
Turgonaliscus Engel 2016 Weald Clay, United Kingdom, Early Cretaceous (Barremian)
Turgonalus Rasnitsyn 1990 Turga Formation, Zabaykalsky Krai, Russia, Early Cretaceous (Aptian)
 Tribe †Maimetshini Rasnitsyn 1975
Afrapia Rasnitsyn and Brothers 2009 Orapa, Botswana, Late Cretaceous (Turonian)
Afromaimetsha Rasnitsyn and Brothers 2009 Orapa, Botswana, Late Cretaceous (Turonian)
Ahstemiam McKellar and Engel 2011 Canadian amber, Late Cretaceous (Campanian)
Andyrossia Rasnitsyn and Jarzembowski 2000 Weald Clay, United Kingdom, Early Cretaceous (Barremian)
Burmaimetsha Perrichot 2013 Burmese amber, Myanmar, Cretaceous (Albian-Cenomanian)
Cretogonalys Rasnitsyn 1977 Taimyr amber, Russia, Late Creaceous (Cenomanian)
Guyotemaimetsha Perrichot et al. 2004 French amber (incl. Charentese amber), Late Cretaceous (Cenomanian)
Iberomaimetsha Ortega-Blanco et al. 2011 Spanish amber, Escucha Formation, Spain, Early Cretaceous (Albian) Taimyr amber, Russia, Late Creaceous (Santonian)
Maimetsha Rasnitsyn 1975 Taimyr amber, Russia, Late Creaceous (Santonian)
Maimetshasia Perrichot 2013 Burmese amber, Myanmar, Cretaceous (Albian-Cenomanian)
Maimetshorapia Rasnitsyn and Brothers 2009 Orapa, Botswana, Late Cretaceous (Turonian)
 Subfamily †Zorophratrinae Engel 2016
 Zorophratra Engel 2016 Lebanese amber, Early Cretaceous (Barremian)

References

Cretaceous insects
Hymenoptera of Africa
Prehistoric insects of Africa

Prehistoric hymenoptera